Tabriz and Suburbs Bus Company is a public transport agency running Transit buses in Tabriz city and surrounding satellite cities and settlements in central East Azerbaijan Province. The system, alongside Tabriz Metro is responsible for urban transportation of Tabriz.

References

Transport in Tabriz
Bus transport in Iran
Transportation in East Azerbaijan Province